Martine Aballéa is a French-American artist born in 1950.

Early life 
Aballéa was born on August 11, 1950 in New York. She has moved to France in 1973. She followed a scientific and philosophical training before starting to write, take photographs and making installations and art performances.

Work 
Aballéa finds her sources of inspiration as much in literature than in the material world. Her work is a mix of concept art, photography, writing and installation. Aballéa projects or about experience, dreams and poetic encounter. Aballéa had solo exhibitions in museums and galleries such as Art in General (New York), the Musée d'art moderne de Paris, the Museum in Progress (Vienna), the LaM (Villeneuve d'Ascq), the Galerie Edouard-Manet (Gennevilliers), the Centre Pompidou and the gallery Art Concept (Paris).

Collections 
Her work is among others in the collections of the Museum of Fine Arts Houston, the Musée d'Art Moderne de Paris, the Centre Pompidou and the Fonds national d'art contemporain.

Bibliography 
Horizons incertains, Les Sables d'Olonne: Musée de l'Abbaye Sainte-Croix, 2010, 

Martine Aballéa : roman partiel, Paris: Semiose, 2009, 

Hôtel passager, Paris : Editions des musées de la ville de Paris, 1999, 

Sous le soleil, Nice: Villa Arson, 1995, 

Prisonnière du sommeil, Paris: Flammarion, 1987, 

Element rage, Joinville le Pont: Presses de la Société B.G.B., 1979

References

External links 

 Martine Aballéa in the Archives of Women Artists (Aware)
Martine Aballéa, une vision lumineuse by Philippe Piguet (in French)

1950 births
Living people
French contemporary artists
21st-century French women artists
21st-century American women artists
Women installation artists
20th-century French women artists